INS Kalvari may refer to:

 , an Indian Navy submarine that was in service from 1967 to 1996
 , an Indian Navy submarine that is in service since 2017

Indian Navy ship names